Mirificarma burdonella is a moth of the family Gelechiidae. It is found on Corsica and Sardinia.

The wingspan is 5.5-6.5 mm for males and 5.5–6 mm for females. The head is cream to light brown. The forewings are mottled light brown and cream, usually darker in the apical fifth and at the costal margin, with an irregular dark brown stripe along the fold. Adults are on wing from August to September.

References

Moths described in 1930
Mirificarma
Moths of Europe